The molecular formula C17H23NO4 (molar mass: 305.37 g/mol, exact mass: 305.1627 u) may refer to:

 Anisodamine, or 7β-hydroxyhyoscyamine
 Bucumolol
 Cetraxate

Molecular formulas